The greater argentine (Argentina silus ; synonymous with Salmo silus), also known as the Atlantic argentine, great silver smelt, herring smelt or simply smelt, is a northern Atlantic herring smelt and can be found at depths from .  This species reaches a length of  SL. It is of commercial importance and it is used as seafood.

Gallery

References

 
 

greater argentine
Fish of the North Atlantic
Taxa named by Peter Ascanius
greater argentine